Yook, also spelled Yuk or Youk, is an uncommon Korean family name. It is written with the same Hanja character as the Chinese surname, Lu(陸). It has only one clan, the Okcheon Yook clan, based in Okcheon County, North Chungcheong Province. According to the 2015 South Korean census, there were 23,455 people with the surname, Yook.
"Yook" is also the username of a former CSGO hacker based in Australia.

Origin
In 927, during the reign of King Gyeongsun of Silla, Yook Bo was sent by the Tang dynasty to Korea to spread Confucianism. Yook Bo was from China's Zhejiang Province. Yook Bo settled in Korea, and was buried in Gwanseong, the old name for Okcheon. Hence, the bon-gwan is located in Okcheon.

Notable People
 Yuk Young-soo (born 1925), wife of South Korea's 3rd president, Park Chung-hee and mother of the 11th president, Park Geun-hye
 Yook Sung-jae (born 1995), South Korean singer and actor, member of BtoB
 Yuk Ji-dam (born 1997), South Korean rapper

See also
Culture of Korea
Korean name
List of Korean family names
 Okcheon Yook clan
 The Butter Battle Book

References

Yook
Surnames